Ban Monikesh (also Romanized as Ban Monīkesh) is a village in Khoshabar Rural District, in the Central District of Rezvanshahr County, Gilan Province, Iran. At the 2006 census, its population was 124, in 29 families.

References 

Populated places in Rezvanshahr County